Perthesøya is an island at the coast of Gustav V Land at Nordaustlandet, Svalbard. It is located outside Torellneset, in the southern part of Augustabukta. The island is named after a German publishing company.

References

Islands of Svalbard